is a Japanese actress, model, and entertainer who is represented by Geiei.

Biography
Koide was born in Katsushika, Tokyo, and was a child actress. From 1992 to 1994, she appeared as Ruga-chan in Ugo Ugo Ruga and was awarded a silver medal in 1993. In 1997, Koide barely did any entertainment activities due to junior high school. She later returned to her entertainment career in 2005. After returning to stage shows and dramas, Koide began working as an actress in films. On October 3, 2006, she became Hayamimi Musume in "Hayamimi Trend No.1" in Mezamashi TV.

On 2012, Koide studied abroad in Denmark. She later married an employee from a Danish company in 2015.

Filmography

TV series
Dramas

Variety series

Films

References

External links
 

Japanese child actresses
Japanese female models
Japanese gravure idols
Japanese television personalities
1985 births
Living people
People from Tokyo
Models from Tokyo Metropolis